Comitas is a genus of medium-sized sea snails, marine gastropod molluscs in the family Pseudomelatomidae.

Species and subspecies
Species and subspecies (indented) in the genus Comitas include:

  † Comitas abnormis L. C. King, 1933
 Comitas aequatorialis (Thiele, 1925)
 Comitas albicincta (A. Adams & Reeve, 1850)
 † Comitas aldingensis Powell, 1944
 † Comitas allani Powell, 1942
 Comitas anteridion (Watson, 1881)
 Comitas arcana (E. A. Smith, 1899)
 † Comitas bilix Marwick, 1931
 Comitas bolognai  Bozzetti, 2001
 Comitas breviplicata (E. A. Smith, 1899)
 Comitas chuni (von Martens, 1902)
  † Comitas clarae (G.F. Harris, 1897)
 Comitas crenularoides (Pritchard, 1896)
 Comitas curviplicata Sysoev, 1996
 † Comitas declivis Powell, 1931
 Comitas elegans Sysoev, 1996
 Comitas ensyuensis (Shikama & Hayashi in Shikama, 1977)
 Comitas erica (Thiele, 1925)
 Comitas eurina (E. A. Smith, 1899)
 Comitas exstructa (von Martens, 1904)
 † Comitas fusiformis (Hutton, 1877)
 † Comitas gagei Maxwell, 1988
 Comitas galatheae Powell, 1969
 Comitas granuloplicata Kosuge, 1992
 Comitas halicyria (Melvill, 1904)
 Comitas hayashii (Shikama, 1977)
 Comitas ilariae Bozzetti, 1991
 † Comitas imperfecta L. C. King, 1933
 Comitas kaderlyi (Lischke, 1872)
 † Comitas kaipara Laws, 1939
 Comitas kamakurana (Pilsbry, 1895)
 Comitas kayalensis Dey, 1962
 † Comitas kenneti Beu, 1970
 Comitas kirai Powell, 1969
 Comitas kuroharai (Oyama, 1962)
 † Comitas latescens (Hutton, 1873)
 † Comitas latiaxialis (P. Marshall, 1918)
 Comitas laura (Thiele, 1925)
 Comitas lurida (A. Adams & Reeve, 1850)
 Comitas makiyamai Shuto, 1961
 Comitas malayana (Thiele, 1925)
 Comitas margaritae (E. A. Smith, 1904)
 Comitas melvilli (Schepman, 1913)
 Comitas miyazakiensis Shuto, 1961
 Comitas murrawolga (Garrard, 1961)
 † Comitas nana Maxwell, 1988
 Comitas oahuensis Powell, 1969
 Comitas obliquicosta (Martens, 1901)
 Comitas obtusigemmata (Schepman, 1913)
 Comitas onokeana King, 1933
 Comitas onokeana vivens Dell, 1956
 Comitas opulenta (Thiele, 1925)
 Comitas pachycercus Sysoev & Bouchet, 2001
 Comitas pagodaeformis (Schepman, 1913)
 Comitas parvifusiformis Li & Li, 2008
 Comitas paupera (Watson, 1881)
 Comitas peelae Bozzetti, 1993
 Comitas powelli Rehder & Ladd, 1973
 † Comitas pseudoclarae A.W.B. Powell, 1944
 Comitas raybaudii Bozzetti, 1994
 † Comitas recticosta (Bellardi, 1847) 
 Comitas rex Sysoev, 1997
 Comitas rotundata (Watson, 1881)
 Comitas saldanhae (Barnard, 1958)
 † Comitas salebrosa (G.F. Harris, 1897)
 Comitas saudesae Cossignani, 2018
 † Comitas silicicola Darragh, 2017
 † Comitas sobrina (M. Yokoyama, 1923 ) 
 † Comitas sobrinaeformis S. Nomura, 1937
 † Comitas spencerensis  E.J. Moore, 1962
 Comitas stolida (Hinds, 1843)
 † Comitas subcarinapex Powell, 1942
 Comitas subsuturalis (von Martens, 1901)
 Comitas suluensis Powell, 1969
 Comitas suratensis (Thiele, 1925)
 † Comitas terrisae Vella, 1954
 Comitas thisbe (E. A. Smith, 1906)
 † Comitas torquayensis Powell, 1944
 Comitas trailli (Hutton, 1873)
 Comitas vezo Bozzetti, 2001
 Comitas vezzaroi Cossignani, 2016
 † Comitas waihaoensis Powell, 1942
 † Comitas williamsi Marwick, 1965
 Comitas wynyardensis (G.B. Pritchard, 1896) 
 † Comitas yokoyamai K. Oyama, 1954

Synonyms
 Comitas aemula Angas, 1877: synonym of Comitas trailli (Hutton, 1873)
 Comitas claviforma Kosuge, 1992 is a basionym for Leucosyrinx claviforma (Kosuge, 1992)
 Comitas kaderleyi Lischke, 1872: synonym of Comitas kaderlyi (Lischke, 1872)
 Comitas luzonica Powell, 1969: synonym of Leucosyrinx luzonica (Powell, 1969)
 Comitas subcorpulenta Smith, 1894: synonym of:Borsonia symbiotes subcorpulenta (Smith, 1894)
 Comitas symbiotes (Wood-Mason & Alcock, 1891): synonym of Borsonia symbiotes (Wood-Mason & Alcock, 1891)
 Comitas undosa Schepman, 1913: synonym of Paracomitas undosa (Schepman, 1913)
 Comitas verrucosa Suter, 1899: synonym of Comitas trailli (Hutton, 1873)
 Comitas yukiae (Shikama, 1962): synonym of  Antiplanes yukiae (Shikama, 1962)

References

 Powell, A.W.B. 1966. The molluscan families Speightiidae and Turridae, an evaluation of the valid taxa, both Recent and fossil, with list of characteristic species. Bulletin of the Auckland Institute and Museum. Auckland, New Zealand 5: 1–184, pls 1–23
 Wilson, B. 1994. Australian marine shells. Prosobranch gastropods. Kallaroo, WA : Odyssey Publishing Vol. 2 370 pp. 
 Powell A. W. B., New Zealand Mollusca, William Collins Publishers Ltd, Auckland, New Zealand 1979 
 ZipCodeZoo

External links
 
 Bouchet, P.; Kantor, Y. I.; Sysoev, A.; Puillandre, N. (2011). A new operational classification of the Conoidea (Gastropoda). Journal of Molluscan Studies. 77(3): 273-308
 Worldwide Mollusc Species Data Base: Pseudomelatomidae
 L. Bozzetti, Description of a new species of the genus Comitas Finlay, 1926 from the Philippines and Reunion (Gastropoda, Turridae); Bull. Inst. Malac. Tokyo 3 (1): 1-3 (1993) 

 
Pseudomelatomidae
Taxa named by Harold John Finlay